MNM is a Belgian pop music radio station, launched in 2009, operated by the Flemish public broadcaster Vlaamse Radio- en Televisieomroep (VRT). The station broadcasts in Flanders and Brussels on FM and can be heard in France and the Netherlands on border areas.

History
On 5 January 2009, Peter van de Veire launched the new radio station. On 8 March 2010, the MNM logo had a small modification, the black letter M became blue, and modernized its studio and website.

On 28 March 2011, MNM added new jingles, a new programme (Sing Your Song) and two new radio hosts (Bert Beauprez, Renée Vermeire), the same year, and the slogan has changed from Let's Have a Big Time to Music and More.

During the 2018 Marathonradio event in June that year, MNM introduced a redesigned logo without the star as well as new graphics and a range of bright and bold colours.

Regular presenters
At the time of final broadcast, sorted alphabetically

Tom De Cock (Saturday afternoons/evenings - De Cock Late Night)
Evy Gruyaert (Weekday mid-mornings)
Anneleen Liégeois (Travel presenter, Co-presenter - David in de ochtend)
Kris Luyten (Travel presenter, co-presenter - ADH Dave)
Dave Peters (ADH Dave)
Marc Pinte (Stand-in for Elias Smekens and Sunday Match)

Ann Reymen (Weekday lunchtimes)
Elias Smekens (Breakfast on Saturdays, Sunday mornings)
Ann Van Elsen (Sunday Match: 8pm - 11pm)
Sofie Van Moll (Battle of the Stars)
Thibaut Renard (Stereo Special)
Bert Beauprez (Weekend)

Programmes
Live presenter-led programmes are broadcast every day between 0600 and 2300. Between 2300 and 0600 (midnight and 0800 on Saturday night/Sunday morning), the station is automated and airs a mix of non-stop music and live, hourly news bulletins.

MNM Hits

MNM Hits is a digital-only station, which consists of continuous pop music without presenter interruption, which was called  Donna Hitbits before the MNM rebranding.

Logo and identities

References

Dutch-language radio stations in Belgium
Radio stations established in 2009